Alba Regia Sportcsarnok is an indoor arena in Székesfehérvár, Hungary. It hosts a number of sport clubs from amateur to professional level, with 2017 Hungarian basketball championship winner Alba Fehérvár being its most notable tenant.

Features

The  field can be used for any indoor sports (basketball, mini-football, table-tennis, box events etc.) except handball. The sport center has a  gym with qualified trainers who can help to the sport lovers. In the hall there is a café and bar.

Alba Regia Sportcentrum has 3,000 seating places for basketball events, that can be expanded by further 1000 seats at the field if necessary. For other events, such as concerts and shows, the figures can go up to 5,000, including standing places.

Events
 2015 FIBA Europe Under-20 Championship (Division B)
 2016-2017 FIBA Europe Cup games
 2017 FIBA Champions League games
 2017-2018 FIBA Europe Cup games
 2017 Fight Arena International Professional Fighting Gala
 2017 Whitney - Queen of The Night

References

Buildings and structures in Székesfehérvár
Sport in Székesfehérvár
Basketball venues in Hungary
Indoor arenas in Hungary
Sports venues completed in 1978
1978 establishments in Hungary